I, Assassin is the fourth solo studio album by English new wave musician Gary Numan, released on 10 September 1982 by Beggars Banquet. It peaked at No. 8 on the UK Album Chart. Three singles were released from the album: "Music for Chameleons", "We Take Mystery (To Bed)" and "White Boys and Heroes", all of which reached the UK Top 20 ("We Take Mystery" peaked at No. 9, and is Numan's last Top 10 single to date).

Overview
Numan's previous studio album, Dance (1981), was an experimental effort that explored and incorporated different musical elements such as jazz. I, Assassin operates in a similar vein. Although the fretless bass and some of the jazz elements of Dance are still in place, Numan went further with I, Assassin, exploring funk music and blending it together with heavier percussion and his own familiar electronic sound. Numan recalled that an important factor during the album's recording was the contribution made by fretless bassist Pino Palladino:

Most of the album was written and recorded between January and March 1982 following Numan's round-the-world trip in a small aircraft. The 24 year old Numan stated that the round-the-world flight and the experience of a near-death plane crash helped him shape a new opinion of himself and gave him a strong self-confidence that he hadn't had before. Later in his career Numan said of I, Assassin: "I still think it's one of the best albums I've made."

For the album's cover sleeve, Numan retained the fedora hat from Dance, with the trench coat and alley background representing I, Assassins 1930s gangster motif. The album cover of I, Assassin was influenced by that of Frank Sinatra's 1954 studio album Songs for Young Lovers.

Before the release of I, Assassin, Numan left Britain to live as a tax exile in the United States. He supported the new album with an 18-date concert tour in America in October–November 1982 (his first series of live shows since his "farewell" shows at Wembley Stadium in 1981). No official live albums or videos have been released from Numan's 1982 tour. Numan recorded a second video for "We Take Mystery (To Bed)" during his stay in Los Angeles, before heading to live in Jersey where he began writing the material for his next studio album, Warriors (1983).

Releases
I, Assassin was originally released on vinyl album and cassette in 1982. It was eventually released on CD in 1993, as a double CD packaged with Numan's 1980 album Telekon (Beggars Banquet had reissued all eight of Numan's studio albums that were released on the label, including the two Tubeway Army albums, as double CD sets). I, Assassin was released on CD by itself in 2002. Both CD releases contain seven bonus tracks.

Chart performance
The album peaked at the 8th position, spending 6 weeks on the UK charts, making it less successful than Numan's previous studio albums.

Track listing
All songs are written by Gary Numan.Side A "White Boys and Heroes" – 6:23
 "War Songs" – 5:05
 "A Dream of Siam" – 6:13
 "Music for Chameleons" – 6:06Side B'
"This Is My House" – 4:52
 "I, Assassin" – 5:26
 "The 1930's Rust" – 3:55
 "We Take Mystery (To Bed)" – 6:10

CD bonus tracks
"War Games" – 3:55
 "Glitter and Ash" – 4:42
 "The Image Is" – 5:55
 "This House Is Cold" – 5:27
 "Noise Noise" – 3:49
 "We Take Mystery" (Early version) – 5:58
 "Bridge? What Bridge?" – 4:22

Personnel
Credits are adapted from the I, Assassin liner notes.
 Gary Numan– vocals; synthesisers; guitar
 Roger Mason – synthesizers
 Pino Palladino – fretless bass; guitar
 Chris Slade – drums; percussion
 John Webb – percussion
 Mike – saxophone; harmonica
 David Van Day – handclaps on "Noise Noise"
 Thereza Bazar – backing vocals on "Noise Noise"
 Nick Robson - backing vocals on “Bridge? What Bridge?”
 Michelle Adams – backing vocals on "Bridge? What Bridge?"
 Mick Karn – backing vocals on "Bridge? What Bridge?"

Production and artwork
 Gary Numan – producer
 Nick Smith – engineer
 Sean Lynch – assistant engineer
 Geoff Howes – photography

References

[ AllMusic]

External links
 

Gary Numan albums
1982 albums
Beggars Banquet Records albums